William Macneile Dixon (1866 – 31 January 1946) was a British author and academic.

Biography

Dixon was born in India, the only son of the Reverend William Dixon and attended Methodist College Belfast. He studied at Trinity College, Dublin, where he was twice Vice-Chancellor's Prizeman in English verse, Downes' Prizeman, and Elrington Prizeman, and graduated First-Class, with the First Senior Moderatorship, in the Modern Literature School, and Second Class, with the Junior Moderatorship, in the Mental and Moral Science School in 1890. He also took considerable part in the public life of the University: he was President of the University Philosophical Society, auditor of the College Historical Society, and chairman of the students' committee for celebrations of the college's tercentenary. In 1891 he was appointed Professor of English Literature in Alexandra College, Dublin, and was also a Dublin University Extension Lecturer; and in 1894 he was elected Professor of English Language and Literature in the Mason Science College, afterwards Birmingham University. He was also Professor of Literature to the Royal Birmingham Society of Artists. He was chosen President of the Library Association of the United Kingdom in 1902, and re-elected in 1903. Lastly, on the transference of Professor Walter Raleigh to Oxford, Professor Dixon received the appointment to the Regius Professorship of English Language and Literature at the University of Glasgow from 1904 until 1935. In 1938 he was elected an honorary fellow of Trinity College Dublin.

Besides articles in the Quarterly Review and other periodicals, Professor Dixon's publications included English Poetry from Blake to Browning; A Tennyson Primer; In the Republic of Letters; a monograph on Trinity College, Dublin, in the College History Series; and The Human Situation (1937), a collection of his Glasgow Gifford lectures that sold its way into seven editions. This is a remarkable conspectus of man's place in the universe which ranges over a very wide field of scientific and philosophical inquiry.

Personal life

In 1891 he married Edith Wales, daughter of G. F. Wales, M.D., F.R.C.S.E. A Portrait of Mrs. Macneile Dixon was painted by the Birmingham artist Kate Bunce.

He was a member of the Royal Ulster Yacht Club.

While visiting Edinburgh, Dixon died on 31 January 1946.

References 

 "Biography of William Macneile Dixon", in The University of Glasgow Story, University of Glasgow.
 George Eyre-Todd, "William Macneile Dixon", in Who's Who in Glasgow 1909.
This article incorporates text from Who's Who in Glasgow 1909 by George Eyre-Todd, a publication now in the public domain.

External links

1866 births
1946 deaths
British literary critics
People educated at Methodist College Belfast
Academics of the University of Glasgow
Honorary Fellows of Trinity College Dublin
Ulster Scots people
Academics from Northern Ireland
Male non-fiction writers from Northern Ireland
Alumni of Trinity College Dublin
Academics of the University of Birmingham
Auditors of the College Historical Society